Venerable is the fourth studio album by Canadian noise rock band KEN mode, released on 15 March 2011 through Profound Lore on compact disc and Init Records on vinyl. Venerable won in the Metal/Hard Music Album of the Year category at the 2012 Juno Awards.

Critical reception

Accolades

Track listing 
All lyrics written by Jesse Matthewson, all music written by KEN mode except "Flight of the Echo Hawk" co-written by KEN mode and Jahmeel Russell.

 "Book of Muscle" – 3:28
 "Obeying the Iron Will..." – 4:26
 "Batholith" – 3:33
 "The Irate Jumbuck" – 7:26
 "A Wicked Pike" – 2:51
 "Flight of the Echo Hawk" – 3:39
 "Never Was" – 8:16
 "The Ugliest Happy You've Ever Seen" – 3:03
 "Terrify the Animals" – 2:58
 "Mako Shark" – 2:58

Personnel 
Venerable album personnel adapted from CD liner notes.

KEN mode
 Jesse Matthewson – guitar, vocals
 Shane Matthewson – drums
 Chad Tremblay – bass, vocals

Additional musicians
 Kurt Ballou – slide guitar on "Terrify the Animals"
 Jahmeel Russell – composing on "Flight of the Echo Hawk"

Production
 Kurt Ballou – engineer, mixing
 Alan Douches – mastering

Artwork and design
 Julie Anne Mann – artwork
 Josh Graham – design, layout
 Aaron Turner – KEN mode logo

References 

2011 albums
Profound Lore Records albums
KEN mode albums
Albums produced by Kurt Ballou